Matilde Schrøder (born 23 March 1996) is a Danish swimmer. She won a bronze medal at the 2016 World Championships in the 4x50 m medley.

Career 
Schrøder competed at the 2016 FINA World Championships. She finished 28th in the heats of the 100 metre breaststroke. She finished 30th in the heats of the 50 metre breaststroke. She competed with Mie Nielsen, Emilie Beckmann, and Jeanette Ottesen in the 4 × 50 metre medley relay, and they won the bronze medal.

She competed at the 2018 European Aquatics Championships. In the 50 metre breaststroke, she finished 14th in the heats and 7th in the semifinals. In the 100 metre breaststroke, she finished 15th in the heats and 8th in the semifinals.

She competed at the 2019 World Aquatics Championships. In the 50 metre breaststroke, she finished 27th in the heats. In the 100 metre breaststroke, she finished 29th in the heats. She competed with Mie Nielsen, Jeanette Ottesen, and Julie Kepp Jensen in the 4 × 100 metre medley relay where they finished 16th in the heats.

References 

1996 births
Living people
Danish female swimmers
Medalists at the FINA World Swimming Championships (25 m)
Place of birth missing (living people)